The 2019 United Arab Emirates Tri-Nation Series was the third round of the 2019–2023 ICC Cricket World Cup League 2 cricket tournament and took place in the United Arab Emirates in December 2019. It was a tri-nation series between Scotland, the United Arab Emirates and the United States cricket teams, with the matches played as One Day International (ODI) fixtures. The ICC Cricket World Cup League 2 formed part of the qualification pathway to the 2023 Cricket World Cup. The International Cricket Council (ICC) confirmed the fixtures for the tri-series in November 2019.

The United Arab Emirates named a squad for the opening match of the series that contained six cricketers who had not played in an ODI match before. The UAE were forced to make changes to their side, following a corruption investigation that impacted the team during the 2019 ICC Men's T20 World Cup Qualifier. As a result of the enforced changes, in the opening match the UAE fielded a team with the youngest average age for their national team.

G. S. Lakshmi was named as the match referee for the opening fixture of the series, becoming the first woman to oversee a men's ODI match.

The United States won their first three matches. The third ODI between the UAE and Scotland was washed out.

Squads

Fixtures

1st ODI

2nd ODI

3rd ODI

4th ODI

5th ODI

6th ODI

References

External links
 Series home at ESPN Cricinfo

2019 in Emirati cricket
2019 in American cricket
2019 in Scottish cricket
International cricket competitions in 2019–20
United Arab Emirates
December 2019 sports events in Asia